The IBM 7770 and IBM 7772 Audio Response Units are an early form of interactive voice response (IVR) technology.  They allowed users to interact directly with an IBM Mainframe using only a touch-tone telephone or a terminal which could generate tones. They are notable for being part of a number of first of a kind IT solutions and also for enabling what is described as the "worlds first talking computer".

Despite these products being considered at one point the "industry standard" with up to a 90% market share, IBM did not develop any new products to replace them.

Operation 
A user could send an inquiry (or submit data) to an IBM Audio Response Unit (ARU) in one of three ways:

 A touch-tone telephone
 An inquiry-type terminal
 An IBM 1001 Data Transmission Terminal.

The inquiry was always in the form of a series of numeric and control characters.  The Audio Response Unit would pass these serially to the attached Mainframe and the response from the Mainframe would be sent to the ARU as codes, corresponding to what words needed to be spoken as a response. The ARU would then look up these codes and play them to the user as spoken words.  The inquiry itself could be either a data lookup, such as a customers bank account balance or a credit check result; or it could be a form of data entry, such as the ID of an absent student, or a retail store order.

IBM 7770 
The IBM 7770 was announced in 1964 with first shipments planned for first quarter 1965.  Rental pricing started at US$1200 per month while the purchase price started at US$57,600. The IBM 7770 was manufactured by IBM in Kingston New York.

The IBM 7770 vocabulary is stored on a rotating magnetic drum. The drum is designed to be interchanged if required, allowing the user to change the vocabulary.

Part of the machine order included the vocabulary order.  IBM would record the words based on the user order. This meant the user could not record the words themselves.

 Users could select either a male or female voice.  As an example, the Michigan Credit Union League selected a female voice they called Connie, which they described as a "pleasant girls voice".
 Users were allowed to specify up to 32 words by default.
 Users could request additional words in sets of 16 up to a maximum of 128 words based on model. The Model 1 is limited to 126 words, the Model 2 to 127 words and the Model 3 to 128 words.
 Lengthy words may be split into two words.  However a track can contain several words if they are monosyllabic  and can be said together in less than 500 ms.   IBM call this a “phrase”.
 One word (one track) is reserved for a silent pause (meaning that the track is blank).
 Letters and numbers (A to Z and 0 to 9) could be requested as part of the vocabulary but each letter or number uses a single track.
 Words could be ordered in languages other than English.

Part of the machine order included the number of carrier lines:

 By default the IBM 7770 has the hardware to connect 4 carrier lines.
 Additional lines are added in increments of 4 up to a maximum of 48.   
 When more than 16 lines are ordered then another frame is added to house them.

There are two panels:  

 An operator panel which offers indicators to show incoming inquiries and an output jack for a user to monitor the response.  
 A CE (Customer Engineer) panel that allows the CE to manual enter an inquiry and listen to the response using earphones and an output jack.   It allows the CE to perform a variety of diagnostics.

There are three models based on which IBM System it attaches to:

The physical configuration is determined by the number of carrier lines:

Example users 

 The Manufacturers Bank of Detroit reported in 1965 that they were installing an IBM 7770 to allow tellers in their 64 branches to look up customer account details.  They claimed it was one of the first installs in the United States.  The project to install it was called Project MARS, which stood for 'Manufacturers Audio Response System".
 The Oakland Country Schools system began using the IBM 7770 in 1969 as a key part of what they claimed was the first fully computerised student attendance system in the United States.  Schools could each morning report tardy or absent students by entering the school ID and then student IDs into a telephone using touch tones and coded cards.
 In 1973 Simpson-Sears in Toronto Canada ran a trial allowing 2000 select customers to place orders from a sales catalog using a 12 key touch-tone telephone.  After entering their home phone number and street number, they could enter catalog numbers to place orders. Seers described it as an acceptable purchasing method using an emerging technology.

IBM 7772 
The 7772 came with support for 2 I/O lines by default and these could be increased to 4, 6 or 8.  The vocabulary was stored in a random access disk device in a digitally coded form. Several 1000 words in mulitiple languages could be stored and replayed using the vocoder technique. By default the 7772 came with a 1000 word vocabulary in American English. IBM 7772 was developed by the IBM Lab in La Gaude, France and manufactured by IBM in Kingston New York.

The exact announcement and withdrawal dates have not been located.  It is mentioned in online documents as early as 1964 and is listed as withdrawn in the 1979 IBM Sales Manual. It does not appear in any online copy of an IBM Manual after 1977.

Example users 

 In 1968 Westinghouse reported they were using an IBM 7772 as part of a system they called Westar (Westinghouse Telephone Aperture Retrieval).  A engineer could request an engineering drawing by dialling into the 7772, entering the desired document number as well as pertinent information like their department code, telephone number and employee number.  They would then be verbally given the result which was either "message accepted" (meaning the order had been placed), or an informative message such as "this is a restricted drawing" or "there is no record of this document".
 The University of Michigan used an IBM 7772 to teach a totally blind man to use Fortran and the MTS operating system using just a touch telephone and a loudspeaker.  They also developed a way to speed up the audio output (eliminating user frustration with the speed of the spoken output) and a software package for MTS that increased the vocabulary of the IBM 7772.
 In 1972 Wayne State University reported they were using an IBM 7772 to allow students to order hard copy printouts.   They entered their order using a touch tone telephone and the IBM 7772 would read their order number out to them. They could then collect their printout from the DP Center.

IBM 1001 
The IBM 1001 Data Transmission terminal allows a user to dial into an Audio Response Unit and send characters entered either with a 10 digit keyboard or from the first 22 columns of a punched card.  It transmits 12 characters per second.  The user has to establish the connection by dialling on the attached telephone.

It was announced on July 18,1960 and withdrawn on January 30, 1980. It was originally launched to transmit data to a remote IBM 24 or IBM 26 Card Punch.

External links 
University of Michigan 7772 User Guide

References 

IBM
IBM hardware
IBM computer peripherals
Products introduced in 1964